Hart Glacier may refer to the following glaciers:

 Hart Glacier (Antarctica), in Wright Valley, Wilkes Land, Antarctica
 Hart Glacier (Greenland), in the Avannaata municipality of Greenland